Mohammad Sohrab is an Indian politician belonging to Trinamool Congress. He was elected as MLA of Bara Bazar in 2006 as a Rashtriya Janata Dal candidate. Later he joined Trinamool Congress.

References

Living people
Trinamool Congress politicians from West Bengal
West Bengal MLAs 2006–2011
Year of birth missing (living people)